Green Spring is a census-designated place (CDP) and railroad town in Hampshire County, West Virginia, United States. As of the 2010 census, its population was 218. Green Spring is located north of Springfield on Green Spring Road (West Virginia Secondary Route 1) near the confluence of the North and South Branches of the Potomac River. Green Spring is also the location of the South Branch Valley Railroad's terminus with the old Baltimore & Ohio Railroad mainline. Green Spring is the site of a one-lane low-water toll bridge that connects Green Spring Road (West Virginia Secondary Route 1) to Maryland Route 51 in Oldtown, Allegany County, Maryland. This bridge is one of only 17 privately owned toll bridges in the United States. The toll for the bridge is currently US$1.50.

History 
The town of Green Spring came into importance in 1819 when the Virginia General Assembly provided for a "public warehouse for the receipt of tobacco be established at Romney warehouse and at Cresap's warehouse at the confluence of the North and South Branches of the Potomac in Hampshire County."

John Jeremiah Jacob (1829-1893) was born in Green Spring December 9, 1829. Jacob was a member of the West Virginia House of Delegates from Hampshire County in 1869 and Governor of West Virginia from 1871 to 1877. Jacob died in Wheeling on November 24, 1893, and is interred at Indian Mound Cemetery in Romney.

The Green Spring Train Station (1882-1885) remains one of the town's most important historic sites.

Parks and recreation 
 Green Spring Recreational Park, Green Spring Road (CR 1)
'"House of the Setting Sun and Haunted Barn"' , 1313 Screamin' Hollow Lane, Buck Way

Churches 
 Green Spring Assembly of God, Norton Street
 Otterbein United Methodist Church, Norton Street

References

External links

Baltimore and Ohio Railroad
South Branch Valley Railroad
Census-designated places in Hampshire County, West Virginia
Census-designated places in West Virginia
Populated places on the North Branch Potomac River